Zygmunt Kubiak (30 April 1929, in Warsaw – 19 March 2004) was a Polish writer, essayist, translator, propagator of the antique culture, and professor at the University of Warsaw.

His book Mitologia Greków i Rzymian was shortlisted for the Nike Award in 1998.

He translated, among others, Virgil's Aeneid, St. Augustine's Confessions, and all poems of Constantine P. Cavafy.

Polish male writers
1929 births
2004 deaths
Nike Award winners

International Writing Program alumni
Translators of Virgil